Geoffrey William Geoffrey-Lloyd, Baron Geoffrey-Lloyd, PC (17 January 1902 – 12 September 1984), was a British Conservative politician.

Background and education
The eldest son of G. W. A. Lloyd of Newbury, Lloyd was educated at Harrow School and Trinity College, Cambridge (MA), during which time he was President of the Cambridge Union Society in 1925.

Political career
Lloyd contested South East Southwark in 1924 without success and Birmingham Ladywood in 1929, when he was defeated by just 11 votes. He was Private Secretary to Sir Samuel Hoare (Secretary of State for Air), 1926–1929, then to Stanley Baldwin (Prime Minister, 1929, subsequently as Leader of the Opposition), 1929–1931.

He was elected as member of parliament (MP) for Birmingham Ladywood in 1931 with a 14,000 majority, holding the seat until 1945. He was Parliamentary Private Secretary to Stanley Baldwin (Lord President of the Council), 1931–1935 and as Prime Minister in 1935. He held office as Under-Secretary of State for the Home Department, 1935–1939; as Secretary for Mines, 1939–1940; as Secretary for Petroleum, 1940–1942; as Chairman of the Oil Control Board, 1939–1945; as Minister in charge of Petroleum Warfare Department 1940–1945, as Parliamentary Secretary to the Ministry of Fuel and Power, 1942–1945; and as Minister of Information in 1945. He was appointed a Privy Counsellor in 1943.

He was a Governor of British Broadcasting Corporation, 1946–1949. He returned to Parliament as member for Birmingham King's Norton, 1950–1955, and for Sutton Coldfield from 1955 until February 1974. During this time he was Minister of Fuel and Power, 1951–1955 and Minister of Education, 1957-October 1959.

He changed his surname from Lloyd to Geoffrey-Lloyd by deed poll on 18 April 1974.

He was created a life peer 6 May 1974 as Baron Geoffrey-Lloyd, of Broomfield in the County of Kent.

Personal life
Lord Geoffrey-Lloyd died at age 82 from natural causes in Kent.

References

External links 
 
 Who was Who
 

1902 births
1984 deaths
Alumni of Trinity College, Cambridge
BBC Governors
British Secretaries of State for Education
British Secretaries of State
Conservative Party (UK) MPs for English constituencies
Geoffrey-Lloyd
Members of the Privy Council of the United Kingdom
Ministers in the Chamberlain peacetime government, 1937–1939
Ministers in the Chamberlain wartime government, 1939–1940
Ministers in the Churchill caretaker government, 1945
Ministers in the Churchill wartime government, 1940–1945
Ministers in the Eden government, 1955–1957
Ministers in the Macmillan and Douglas-Home governments, 1957–1964
Ministers in the third Churchill government, 1951–1955
Parliamentary Private Secretaries to the Prime Minister
People educated at Harrow School
Presidents of the Cambridge Union
UK MPs 1931–1935
UK MPs 1935–1945
UK MPs 1950–1951
UK MPs 1951–1955
UK MPs 1955–1959
UK MPs 1959–1964
UK MPs 1964–1966
UK MPs 1966–1970
UK MPs 1970–1974
UK MPs who were granted peerages
Life peers created by Elizabeth II